The Jackson Open was a golf tournament on the LPGA Tour in 1957, 1958, and 1965. It was played at Colonial Country Club in Jackson, Mississippi.

Winners
All State Ladies' Invitational
1965 Jo Ann Prentice

Jackson Open
1959-64 No tournament
1958 Jackie Pung

Colonial Open
1957 Betty Dodd

References

Former LPGA Tour events
Golf in Mississippi
1957 establishments in Mississippi
Jackson, Mississippi
History of women in Mississippi